Alexander Morgan Mason  (born June 26, 1955) is an American film producer, actor and political operative. He was born to actors Pamela Mason and James Mason, and is married to singer Belinda Carlisle.

Early life
Mason was born June 26, 1955 in  Los Angeles, California, the son of English parents, actor James Mason and actress and commentator Pamela Mason. His grandfather, the financier and film producer Isidore Ostrer, was head of the Gaumont-British Picture Corporation.

As a child, Mason appeared in the films Hero's Island (1962), along with his father, and The Sandpiper (1965), with Elizabeth Taylor and Richard Burton.

Business career
When his grandfather Isidore Ostrer died, Mason inherited his seat on the board of Illingworth, Morris, Ltd., then the world's largest woolen textile company. Mason served as executive director and three years later sold the firm.

Political career
After moving to the U.S., Mason worked for Ronald Reagan's 1980 presidential campaign. He served as assistant finance director, then as major events director, and served as a member of the campaign's executive advisory committee. Reagan selected him as a delegate-at-large from California to the 1980 Republican national convention. After the election, Mason was named special assistant to the co-chairmen of the presidential inaugural committee. After the inauguration, Mason was appointed deputy chief of protocol at the State Department. He was then named special assistant to the president for political affairs. During his tenure he was chosen to attend the funeral services of Egyptian president Anwar Sadat as a member of the official United States delegation along with former US presidents Richard Nixon, Gerald Ford and Jimmy Carter.

PR, film and television 
After Mason left the White House in 1982, he became the vice president of Rogers and Cowan Public Relations. In 1984, he joined promoter Don King to promote the Jacksons' Victory Tour. Mason went on to become an executive producer of Sex, Lies, and Videotape (1989), which won the Palme d'Or at the Cannes Film Festival and the Audience Award at the Sundance Film Festival. In 1986, Reagan appointed him to The Commission for the Preservation of America's Heritage Abroad and made him a special advisor to the President's Council on Physical Fitness and Sports. In 1990, Mason became vice president and head of the independent film division of the William Morris Agency in Beverly Hills. He left to become chief executive of London Films in 1996. In 1999 Mason founded the European television channel Innergy in partnership with musician Dave Stewart of Eurythmics, who was introduced to Mason by Deepak Chopra. It was "the first channel of its kind in the world with programmes offering viewers help and guidance for self-empowerment."

Personal life
Mason married singer Belinda Carlisle in 1986, eloping to Lake Tahoe. They have a son, James Duke Mason. In 2017, he and Carlisle moved to Bangkok, Thailand.

References

The Reagan Diaries, p. 109

External links
 

1955 births
Living people
American male film actors
Film producers from California
California Republicans
American people of English descent
Male actors from Beverly Hills, California
American expatriates in Thailand
Chiefs of Protocol of the United States
James Mason family